A constitutional referendum was held in Liberia on 7 May 1935, alongside general elections. The changes to the constitution ensured that President Edwin Barclay remained in office without the need for the presidential elections due that year. Although it was claimed to be for economic reasons, the government feared that an election may lead to instability that would lower confidence of foreign powers and creditors. The next elections took place in 1939.

Background
On 26 November 1934 the Legislature approved a term extension for the President. As this required amending the constitution, article 17 of chapter V of the constitution dictated that a referendum was required, with a two-thirds majority needed for the amendments to be passed.

Changes to the constitution
The referendum proposed modifying article 1 of chapter III of the constitution regarding the presidential term, whilst adding a new section to article 5 of chapter III regarding the civil service.

References

1935 referendums
1935 in Liberia
Referendums in Liberia
Constitutional referendums in Liberia
May 1935 events